Kevin James Johnson (born April 25, 1967) is an American professional golfer.

College career
Johnson was born in Plymouth, Massachusetts. He attended Clemson University and was Clemson's first three-time All-American in golf (he was a third-team choice in 1987 as a sophomore, then made first-team as a junior and second-team as a senior). He was inducted into the Clemson Hall of Fame in 2002. He also won the U.S. Amateur Public Links in 1987.

Professional career
Johnson has made about 80% of his career earnings while playing on the Web.com Tour, where he has won six times, twice during the 2009 season. The first came in a playoff victory over Jeff Gallagher at the Rex Hospital Open, and the second came at the Knoxville Open in a two-hole playoff win over Bradley Iles. However he has not found much success on the PGA Tour, making only 22 cuts in 67 tries. In 2009, he finished 13th on the Nationwide Tour money list to earn his 2010 PGA Tour card.

Personal life
Johnson credits his father, Ken, as his hero for helping him succeed in golf.  He has been married since 1998 to wife, Christa.  They have two daughters; Jordan Paige and Jade Alexandra.

Amateur wins
1987 U.S. Amateur Public Links, Massachusetts Amateur
1988 Massachusetts Amateur

Professional wins (8)

Sunshine Tour wins (1)

Nationwide Tour wins (6)

*Note: The 1997 Nike Puget Sound Open was shortened to 54 holes due to rain.

Nationwide Tour playoff record (3–0)

Other wins (1)
1986 Massachusetts Open (as an amateur)

Results in major championships

Note: Johnson only played in the U.S. Open.
CUT = missed the half-way cut

U.S. national team appearances
Amateur
Eisenhower Trophy: 1988
Walker Cup: 1989

See also
2000 PGA Tour Qualifying School graduates
2009 Nationwide Tour graduates
List of golfers with most Web.com Tour wins

External links

Profile on Clemson Tigers Athletic site

American male golfers
Clemson Tigers men's golfers
PGA Tour golfers
Korn Ferry Tour graduates
Golfers from Massachusetts
Golfers from Florida
People from Plymouth, Massachusetts
People from Palm Beach Gardens, Florida
1967 births
Living people
Sportspeople from Plymouth County, Massachusetts